Adolf Hitler, dictator of Germany from 1933 to 1945, earned millions of Reichsmarks (ℛℳ) throughout his political career, mainly through sales of his book Mein Kampf ("My Struggle") and his combined Chancellor's and President's salaries. After coming to power, Hitler made himself tax-exempt.

Early life

Adolf Hitler was born on 20 April 1889 and grew up in Braunau am Inn, a small Austrian village on the border with Germany. His family was rather poor and three of his siblings —Gustav, Ida, and Otto— died in infancy due to common childhood diseases. Hitler's mother, Klara, was a homemaker. Hitler's father, Alois, unsuccessfully tried to establish a farm. After going through high school in Linz, he moved to Vienna where he was initially supported by his mother and orphan's benefits.

Artistic ambitions

Once in Vienna, Hitler lived a Bohemian life alongside his childhood friend August Kubizek. The two shared a room rented from a local tailor. Hitler painted pictures, watercolors and copied postcards and sold them to tourists for a small profit. In 1907, he applied to join Vienna's Academy of Fine Arts, but was rejected due to a "lack of talent". In 1908, Hitler tried again, but was once again rejected. Shortly afterwards, Hitler ran out of money and was forced to live in homeless shelters and men's hostels. In 1913, Hitler received legacies from his deceased relatives and decided to move to Munich, a large German city located in Bavaria.

Mein Kampf sales
Hitler wrote his political manifesto and autobiography Mein Kampf ("My Struggle") in Landsberg prison while serving a sentence for high treason committed during the failed Beer Hall Putsch of 1923. Mein Kampf was printed by the Franz Eher Nachfolger publishing house and largely ignored at first, but sales began to boom in the late 1920s and early 1930s as economic depression and social unrest troubled Germany, factors which significantly boosted Hitler's popularity. After Hitler came to power in 1933, couples who married during the Nazi state were given a copy as a wedding gift. The book eventually became a best-seller within Nazi Germany, selling almost twelve million copies by the war's end.

Nazi Party funds
While hyperinflation of the Weimar Republic had crippled the German economy and plunged millions of German workers into unemployment, Hitler and his party received lavish donations from wealthy benefactors at home and abroad. The iconic American car maker and anti-Semite Henry Ford was reported to be one of the foreign supporters. Edwin and Helene Bechstein, part of a rich aristocratic family who sold pianos, supported Hitler financially. The Ruhr steel barons Fritz Thyssen and Gustav Krupp donated almost five million Reichsmarks to the Nazi Party over the course of the war. 

Much of the party's income from donations was used to pay for Hitler's private projects, such as the Berghof and Eagle's Nest. After examining Hitler's tax records from the Bavarian State Archives in Munich, economics journalist Wolfgang Zdral said, "He's driving a Mercedes, which cost incredible amounts of money at the time, can afford to go on travels and has enough money to finance his propaganda appearances. All of this is financed through a system of slush-funds, essentially the donation of larger and smaller benefactors".

Tax evasion
Throughout his rise to power, Hitler neglected to pay taxes on his income and allowances. He was given only eight days to pay off this debt. Hitler responded by ordering a state secretary of the ministry of finance to intervene, and became tax-exempt. The head of the Munich tax office declared: "All tax reports delivering substance for a tax obligation by the Führer are annulled from the start. The Führer is therefore tax-exempt." After the death of President Paul von Hindenburg, Hitler took over his office and claimed his salary as well.

In his last will and testament, Hitler left his entire estate to the German government: "What I own, as far as it is worth anything, belongs to the party. Should this no longer exist, the German state. Should the state also be destroyed, there is no need for a further decision on my part".

See also
 Tax evasion
 Unreported employment

References

Sources

Printed

Online
 
 

Wealth and income
Tax evasion
Wealth
Income